Parachalciope binaria is a moth of the family Noctuidae first described by William Jacob Holland in 1894. It is found in the Democratic Republic of the Congo, Gabon, Nigeria, Uganda and Cameroon.

References

Catocalinae
Insects of West Africa
Insects of Uganda
Fauna of Gabon
Moths of Africa